Magras is a surname. Notable people with the surname include:

Bruno Magras (born 1951), French politician
Michel Magras (born 1954), French politician

See also
Magra (disambiguation)
Magrs